IFAP syndrome is an extremely rare genetic syndrome. It is also known as Ichthyosis follicularis, alopecia, and photophobia syndrome or simply ichthyosis follicularis. It is extremely rare: there were only 40 known cases (all male) until 2011.

Symptoms and signs
The main symptoms are given by its name: dry, scaly skin (ichthyosis), absence of hair (atrichia) and excessive sensitivity to light (photophobia). Additional features include short stature, mental retardation, seizures and a tendency for respiratory infections.

Genetics
Most cases are X-linked recessive but there may be as many as three types. As well as a classical X-linked form, there is another type where females are partially affected and another where females have full IFAP symptoms. The gene or genes causing this disease are not known.

Diagnosis
Diagnosis is based on appearance and family history. KID syndrome or keratosis follicularis spinulosa decalvans have some similar symptoms and must be eliminated.

See also
Cicatricial alopecia
 List of cutaneous conditions

References 

Genodermatoses
Rare diseases
Syndromes